Malaysia Airports Holdings Berhad is a Malaysian airport company that manages most of the airports in Malaysia. The firm was recently awarded the duty to manage airports in international destinations. It has its head office in the Malaysia Airports Corporate Office in the Persiaran Korporat KLIA in Kuala Lumpur International Airport (KLIA), Sepang, Selangor.

History

Malaysia Airports Berhad was incorporated in 1991 when the Malaysian Parliament passed a bill to separate the Department of Civil Aviation (DCA) into two entities with different spheres of responsibilities. DCA remains the regulatory body for the airports and aviation industry in Malaysia, whilst the newly created entity, Malaysia Airports Berhad, is to focus on the operation, management, and maintenance of airports. In November 1992, Malaysia Airports Berhad was duly licensed by the Minister of Transport Malaysia to carry out its function as the airport operator.

The holding company, Malaysia Airports Holdings Berhad (MAHB) was incorporated as a public limited company in November 1999 and was thereafter listed on the Main Board of the Kuala Lumpur Stock Exchange, becoming the first airport operating company to be listed in Asia and the sixth in the world. The company is listed on the Malaysian Stock Exchange (Bursa Malaysia).

The main airport is the KL International Airport (KLIA). KLIA is the result of a visionary strategy to meet the needs of new large aircraft and the traffic demand of the 21st century. KLIA has pioneered the use of state-of-the-art technology in airport management known as Total Airport Management Systems (TAMS). TAMS, managed by Malaysia Airport (Technologies) Sdn. Bhd. consists of more than 40 systems and airport functions including air traffic management, baggage handling, passenger check-in, and flight information display.

MAHB's present corporate structure includes several operating subsidiaries; Malaysia Airports Sdn. Bhd. (MASB), Malaysia Airports (Sepang) Sdn. Bhd., Malaysia Airports (Niaga) Sdn. Bhd., Malaysia Airports Technologies Sdn. Bhd., Malaysia Airports (Properties) Sdn. Bhd., K.L. Airport Hotel Sdn. Bhd., MAB Agriculture-Holticulture Sdn. Bhd, Malaysia Airports Consultancy Services Sdn. Bhd., Malaysia International Aerospace Centre (MIAC) Sdn Bhd., and Urusan Teknologi Wawasan Sdn. Bhd.. The Group has a total staff strength of over 10,000 deployed across 39 offices nationwide.

MAHB has acquired Sabiha Gocken International Airport in Istanbul, Turkey. MAHB also previously provided airport management services for the Angkor International Airport, Hyderabad International Airport India, Delhi International Airport India, Maldives International Airport and Phnom Penh International Airport in Cambodia through a joint-venture arrangement with Aéroports de Paris Management S.A

Malaysia Airports owns Training Centre (MATC), located near Kuala Lumpur International Airport and Penang International Airport. These were established to cater for the training needs of all Malaysia Airports personnel. The MATCs have also been used as a centre for security related programs conducted by International Civil Aviation Organisation (ICAO). In addition, the MATCs provides expertise on aviation security and safety matters to the Malaysian government and airlines.

List of subsidiaries

Airports managed
The company manages 39 airports in Malaysia. Among them are:

Other than Malaysia, the company currently manages one international airport outside of Malaysia.

 Sabiha Gökçen International Airport in Istanbul, Turkey

Awards
 Chartered Institute of Logistics and Transport Malaysia – Company of the Year 2007

See also

 List of airports in Malaysia

References

External links
 

 
Companies listed on Bursa Malaysia
Government-owned companies of Malaysia
Transport companies established in 1991
1991 establishments in Malaysia
Airport operators
Companies based in Sepang
Khazanah Nasional